Büyük Teklif (Turkish for "big offer") is the Turkish version of Deal or No Deal that airs on Kanal D. Hosted by Halit Ergenç, it was broadcast between June 5 and December 11, 2006. The amounts go from as little as 1 kuruş to as big as 500,000 Turkish lira (about US$350,000, €270,000, and £178,000).

Kanal D's website reveals that the set is quite similar to the US counterpart, as with many other post-2005-launched versions of the show.

Case values

See also
Var mısın? Yok musun? - Another Turkish version of Deal or No Deal, produced by Show TV.

External links

Deal or No Deal
Turkish game shows
2006 Turkish television series debuts
2006 Turkish television series endings
Kanal D original programming